Eschweilera rionegrense is a species of woody plant in the family Lecythidaceae. Found only in Brazil, it is threatened by habitat loss.

References

rionegrense
Flora of Brazil
Vulnerable plants
Taxonomy articles created by Polbot